The Tidal Stakes is a discontinued Thoroughbred horse race for three-year-olds run at the Sheepshead Bay Race Track in Sheepshead Bay, Brooklyn, New York from the 1880s through until the track closed in 1910. According to a 1901 report on the race by The New York Times, the Tidal Stakes was one of the famous fixtures of the Sheepshead Bay Spring meeting.

The inaugural running in 1881 was won by Luke Blackburn. Ridden by Jim McLaughlin and trained by James G. Rowe Sr., following the creation of the National Museum of Racing and Hall of Fame, horse, jockey and trainer would all be inducted. The final running of the Tidal Stakes took place on 1910 and was won by The Turk who recorded the fastest time in the history of the race at the mile and a quarter distance.

The most significant event in the history of the Tidal Stakes was Colin's win in 1908. The future Hall of Fame horse who would be ranked 15th in the 2000 Blood-Horse magazine List of the Top 100 U.S. Racehorses of the 20th Century, retired undefeated after his fifteenth career win in the Tidal.

The 1885 race resulted in a dead heat for first between James T. Williams Kentucky Derby winner Joe Cotton and Norman Kittson's colt Pardee.

Records
Speed record:
 1 ¼ miles: 2:03 4/5, The Turk (1910)
 1 mile: 1:38 4/5,  Watercolor  (1901)

Most wins by a jockey:
 8 - Jim McLaughlin (1880, 1881, 1882, 1883, 1885, 1886, 1887, 1889)

Most wins by a trainer:
 8 - James G. Rowe Sr. (1880, 1881, 1882, 1883, 1905, 1907, 1908, 1909)

Most wins by an owner:
 6 - Dwyer Brothers Stable (1880, 1881, 1882, 1883, 1886, 1887)

Winners

 † 1885 dead heat for first between Joe Cotton and Pardee.

References

Sheepshead Bay Race Track
Flat horse races for three-year-olds
1880 establishments in New York (state)
Discontinued horse races in New York City
Recurring sporting events established in 1880
Recurring events disestablished in 1910
1910 disestablishments in New York (state)